UNICOM Government, Inc. (UGI) is an American information technology (IT) hardware and solutions company. It is a sub-division of UNICOM Global. It was formerly GTSI Corp, founded in 1983 and acquired by UNICOM Global in 2012 (see history).

Overview
UNICOM Government provides information technology solutions and professional services for the US Federal, State, and Local Governments. UNICOM Government, Inc. is informally known by its abbreviation, UGI.

History
UNICOM Government was founded in 1983 as Government Technology Services Incorporated (GTSI) to provide microcomputer software to the federal government of the United States. 
By 1986, it was working with local, state and federal government agencies. 
In 1994, it introduced the first browser-based government contract catalog. 
In 1996, it registered its URL and engaged in e-commerce. 
In 1999, it launched the first government IT portal, governmentIT.com, featuring the latest in IT applications for government employees.
In June 2012, it was acquired by UNICOM Global, after UNICOM completed a tender offer for outstanding shares of GTSI common stock for $7.75 per share in cash; GTSI became a wholly owned subsidiary of UNICOM, and GTSI stock was delisted from NASDAQ. GTSI Corp. was renamed UNICOM Government, Inc. in 2013, and is now a division of its parent company, UNICOM Global, Inc.
In June 2014, UGI was awarded a $774 million contract extension to provide U.S. Army Technology Solutions as part of the Army’s ITES-2H contract that had a $6.763 billion procurement ceiling.
In April 2021, the Defense Intelligence Agency (DIA) Site III award was awarded to Team Business Integra (Team BI), which included UGI as a team member. This 10-year, $12.6 billion dollar, multi-award IDIQ for Information Technology Solutions includes several Task Orders for the delivery of IT and technical support services to the Defense Intelligence Agency (DIA) and the National Geospatial-Intelligence Agency (NGA).

References

External links

Companies established in 1983
Software companies based in Virginia
Herndon, Virginia
Companies formerly listed on the Nasdaq
2012 mergers and acquisitions
Software companies of the United States